Riot in English is the debut studio album by American singer Dale Bozzio. It was released on March 4, 1988 by Paisley Park Records. Bozzio began working on the album after her divorce from Terry Bozzio and the break-up of their band Missing Persons. She got signed to Prince's record label Paisley Park Records and collaborated with Robert Brookins and Attala Zane Giles on the album while co-writing most of the songs. Musically, the songs took a slightly different direction than her work with Missing Persons, incorporating more dance-pop sound rather than new wave music.

Three singles were released from the album. The lead single "Simon Simon" reached the dance charts, peaking inside the top forty on the Billboard Dance Club Songs chart. However, the following singles "Riot in English" and "Overtime" failed to chart.

Critical reception 

Joe Viglione from AllMusic praised Bozzio's lyrics saying that "she knows how to pull a chic cliché and envelope it" and also added that Prince gave her "the opportunity to prove she's as charming on record as she is in person and a talent in her own right apart from Missing Persons".

Track listing

Credits and personnel 

 Dale Bozzio – vocals, songwriter, design
 Robert Brookins – producer, songwriter, keyboards, drums, percussion, backing vocals
 Attala Zane Giles – producer, songwriter, keyboards, drums, percussion, backing vocals
 Tony Haynes – songwriter
 Prince – songwriter
 Lovely Anglin – backing vocals
 Carl Carwell – backing vocals
 David Cochrane – backing vocals
 Ray Grady – backing vocals
 Keith John – backing vocals
 Gordon Jones – backing vocals, songwriter
 Lenward L. Holness II – backing vocals, design
 Roland West – backing vocals
 Kevin Chokan – guitar
 Bobby Gonzales – guitar
 Michael Landau – guitar

 Coke Johnson – engineer, mixing
 Erik Zobler  – engineer
 Mitch Gibson – engineer
 Susan Rogers – engineer
 Jeff Goodman – assistant engineer
 Jimmy Preziosi – assistant engineer
 Steve Ford – assistant engineer
 Mick Guzauski – mixing
 Tommy Vicari – mixing
 Brian Gardner – mastering
 Cynthia Moore – photography
 Doug Powell – design
 Dina Branhan – production coordinator
 Karen E. Wood – production coordinator
 Jamie Shoop – management

Credits adapted from the album's liner notes.

References

External links 
 [ Riot in English] at AllMusic
 

Dale Bozzio albums
1988 debut albums
Paisley Park Records albums